The UC Davis Aggies baseball team represents the University of California, Davis in the sport of baseball. The team competes in Division I of the National Collegiate Athletics Association (NCAA) and in the Big West Conference. They are currently led by head coach Tommy Nicholson, who has held the position since 2022.

The Aggies competed at the NCAA Division II level through 2005.  At that level, they appeared in the NCAA Division II Baseball Championship 7 times, including two appearances in the College World Series, where they earned fifth-place finishes each time.  At the Division I level, the Aggies have made one appearance in the NCAA Division I Baseball Championship, in 2008, where they finished 1–2 in regional competition.

In 2008, future major leaguer Ty Kelly led the Big West Conference with a .397 batting average as a sophomore, and was #2 in the Big West Conference in hits with 94; his career batting average and hits total rank second and third, respectively, in Aggies history.

Aggies in the NCAA Division I Baseball tournament

The NCAA Division I baseball tournament started in 1947.
The format of the tournament has changed through the years.

Controversy

In July 2021, the entire UC Davis Aggies baseball program was suspended and the coaching staff was placed on administrative leave due to allegations of misconduct.

See also

List of NCAA Division I baseball programs

References

External links